The William Miller Farm is a historic farm property on County Road 11 in Hampton, New York.  It is a historic district that encompasses the home of William Miller, who was a Baptist preacher credited with beginning the mid-nineteenth century North American religious movement that was known as the Millerites. After his prophetic interpretations did not happen as he expected, new heirs of his message emerged, including Seventh-day Adventists and Advent Christians. Later movements found inspiration in Miller's emphasis on Bible prophecy.  The property includes Miller's farmhouse, a chapel he built for Adventist worship, and Ascension Rock, the place where some of his followers gathered to await the Second Advent on October 22, 1844.

The chapel and Ascension Rock were listed on the National Register of Historic Places in 1975 as William Miller Chapel and Ascension Rock.  The historic district's boundaries were increased in 1994 to include Miller's farmhouse and a portion of his agricultural properties.

References

Historic districts on the National Register of Historic Places in New York (state)
National Register of Historic Places in Washington County, New York
Millerites